The 1985 South American Under-16 Football Championship was the inaugural edition of the South American Under-17 Football Championship, a football competition for the under-16 national teams in South America organized by CONMEBOL. It was held in Argentina from 1–22 April 1985.

Argentina were crowned champions, and together with Brazil, which were the top two teams of this tournament, alongside invitee Bolivia, qualified for the 1985 FIFA U-16 World Championship in China.

Teams

 (hosts)

Venues

The venues were José Amalfitani Stadium, and Estadio Arquitecto Ricardo Etcheverry, Buenos Aires and Estadio Jorge Luis Hirschi, La Plata.

The tournament
The top two teams qualified to the 1985 FIFA U-16 World Championship.

Tiebreakers
When teams finished level of points, the final rankings were determined according to:

 goal difference
 goals scored
 head-to-head result between tied teams (two teams only)
 drawing of lots

All times local, UTC−3.

Matchday 1

Matchday 2

Matchday 3

Matchday 4

Matchday 5

Matchday 6

Matchday 7

Matchday 8

Matchday 9

Winners

Qualified teams for FIFA U-16 World Championship
The following three teams from CONMEBOL qualified for the 1985 FIFA U-16 World Championship.

References

1985
1985 South American Under-16 Championship
1985 in South American football
1985 in Argentine football
1985 in youth association football
1985